Decipherment is the analysis of documents written in ancient languages.

Decipher may also refer to:

 Decipher (novel), the novel by Stel Pavlou
 Decipher (After Forever album), 2001 album
 Decipher (John Taylor album)
 Decipher, Inc., a game publisher based in Norfolk, Virginia, United States
 DECIPHER, database of chromosome abnormalities identified from analysis of patient DNA
 DECIPHER (software), a program for deciphering and managing biological sequences